This is a list of museums in Syria.

National Museum of Damascus
National Museum of Aleppo
National Museum of Latakia
National Museum of Tartous
National Museum of the Arts and popular Traditions of Syria
Palmyra Museum 
Deir ez-Zor Museum
Raqqa Museum
Homs Museum 
Idleb Museum
Suweida Museum (Municipality Building) 
Ma'arrat al-Nu'man Museum (Mossaic Museum)
Qalaat al-Madiq (Citadel)
Arwad Museum (Citadel)
Bosra Museum (Citadel)
Archeological Museum of Shahba
Apamea Museum 
Ebla Museum
Amrit Museum
Khan As'ad Pasha
Azm Palace
Azm Palace (Hama)
Aleppo Citadel Museum
Beit Ghazaleh (Memory Museum, Aleppo)
Beit Achiqbash (Museum of Popular Traditions, Aleppo)
Beit Junblatt (Aleppo)
Al-Shibani Church
Khanqah al-Farafira
Maktab Anbar
Nur al-Din Bimaristan
Tomb of the Unknown Soldier (Damascus)
Al-Khatt al-Arabi (Arabic Calligraphy, Damascus)
Museum of Epigraphy (Damascus)
Al-Bayt al-Shami (Historical museum of Damascus)
Damascus Museum of Agriculture

See also

Culture of Syria
List of museums

References

Museums
 
Syria
Museums
Museums
Syria